The Frink School of Figurative Sculpture was an art school in Leek, Staffordshire. It was named after Elisabeth Frink (1930–1993), British Sculptor, and was a small intimate academy with a specific discipline of study closer in spirit to a master and apprentice structure than an educational institution. It was directed by the British sculptor Rosemary Barnett; other artists involved in its educational role included Harry Everington, Alan Thornhill and Ken Ford.

Its prime aim and charitable purpose was to provide an education in the observational and technical disciplines of figurative sculpture and to support and encourage the creative potential revealed in the process.

Everington met Barnett in 1990 at the Sir Henry Doulton School of Sculpture in Stoke on Trent. When, in 1993, the funding was removed from the Doulton School, they both set about establishing a successor to it, which would try to give some balance to the trend towards conceptual work in sculpture schools. The school covered every aspect of figurative sculpture, including welding, carving in wood and stone, letter cutting, mould-making and casting – in addition to modelling in clay. 

The Frink School opened in 1996 in Longton, moving to Tunstall in 1999. It initially ran a two-year full-time course, with about 4–9 students entered the School per year. Rita Phillips joined Barnett in teaching. The school ceased running full-time courses in 2005.

The tutorial direction was more concerned with revelation in sculpture than its viability in the art market or the gallery. For two years of their lives, the members of this community were expected to search with perception and imagination and find sculptural means to express that which they could discover. It was expected that this would serve them for the rest for their lives.

The Patron of the School was Lin Jammet, Lis Frink's son.

References

Art schools in England
Education in Staffordshire
Educational institutions established in 1996
1996 establishments in England